Matheson Iacopelli (born May 15, 1994) is an American professional ice hockey winger, who is currently playing with the Kalamazoo Wings of the ECHL. He was drafted 83rd overall by the Chicago Blackhawks in the 2014 NHL Draft.

Playing career

Amateur
Iacopelli joined the Muskegon Lumberjacks of the USHL during the 2013–14 season. He was the leading scorer for Muskegon as a 19-year-old USHL rookie, as he led the league with 41 goals and had 23 assists in 58 regular season games and was +12 with 47 penalty minutes. He was then drafted 83rd overall by the Chicago Blackhawks in the 2014 NHL Draft, respectively, after that season.

During the 2014–15 season, Iacopelli scored 23 goals for Muskegon in his second USHL season, sharing the team lead with Tom Marchin. He had 14 assists and was -16 with 38 penalty minutes that year as well.

Iacopelli had already committed to playing college hockey at Western Michigan in 2014-15 in September the same year he entered the USHL and became the leading scorer for Muskegon as a rookie. He left the USHL and committed to the NCAA for the Western Michigan Broncos of the NCHC.

Professional
After his sophomore season with the Broncos in the 2016–17 season, Iacopelli opted to end his collegiate career in agreeing to a two-year entry-level contract with the Chicago Blackhawks on March 29, 2017. He immediately joined AHL affiliate, the Rockford IceHogs, to play out the remainder of the year.

During the 2018–19 season, while stagnating within the Blackhawks AHL and ECHL affiliate's, Iacopelli was traded by Chicago to the Los Angeles Kings in exchange for Spencer Watson on February 24, 2019. He was assigned to play out the remainder of the season with the Manchester Monarchs of the ECHL.

Having completed his entry-level contract with the Kings, Iacopelli was not tendered a qualifying offer and was released to free agency on June 25, 2019. Unable to attract NHL interest, Iacopelli agreed to a contract with the Kalamazoo Wings of the ECHL on September 9, 2019.

Personal
Iacopelli is one of only two players to have played for the Woodhaven Warriors ice hockey team that has been drafted by an NHL team (Jeremy Smith being the other in the 2007 NHL Draft at 54th overall). He is the son of Marco Iacopelli and Victoria DePalma. He also has two sisters, Chelsea and Marinna, and two brothers, Marco and Fedor.

Career statistics

Awards and honours

References

External links

1994 births
Living people
American men's ice hockey right wingers
Chicago Blackhawks draft picks
Indy Fuel players
Kalamazoo Wings (ECHL) players
Manchester Monarchs (ECHL) players
Muskegon Lumberjacks players
Rockford IceHogs (AHL) players
Western Michigan Broncos men's ice hockey players
People from Wayne County, Michigan